Oilinyphia is a genus of Asian dwarf spiders that was first described by H. Ono & H. Saito in 1989.

Species
 it contains three species:
Oilinyphia hengji Zhao & Li, 2014 – China
Oilinyphia jadbounorum Ponksee & Tanikawa, 2010 – Thailand
Oilinyphia peculiaris Ono & Saito, 1989 (type) – Japan (Ryukyu Is.)

See also
 List of Linyphiidae species (I–P)

References

Araneomorphae genera
Linyphiidae
Spiders of Asia